Kvæøya is an island in Kvæfjord Municipality in Troms og Finnmark county, Norway. It is located in the Kvæfjorden, an arm of the Gullesfjorden. In 2010, the Kvæøy Bridge was completed, connecting the village of Hundstad on the island to a point just west of the village of Straumen on the main island of Hinnøya.

The island is considered as very favorable to farming, with large farms located on southern and western sides. The northern and eastern sides of the island are steep and mountainous. There are no buildings or fertile ground on that part of the island.

See also
List of islands of Norway

References

Kvæfjord
Islands of Troms og Finnmark